Smile (born Than Thar Htoo on 22 July 1986) is a Burmese actress, singer, former model, writer and businesswoman. She is one of the popular actresses around 2000s and achieved fame and success as an actress and singer. Throughout her career, she has acted in over 100 films.

Early life and education 
Smile was born on 22 July 1986 in Yangon, Myanmar. She is the granddaughter of famous actress Khin Lay Swe. She is the youngest daughter of two siblings, having an elder sister. She went to study in London at Uxbridge College.

Career
Smile began her modeling career in 1998 at the age of 14. She also appeared on magazine cover photos and as commercial model for many TV advertisement. Then came the offers for TV commercials and then DVD ones. Her hardwork as a model and acting in commercials was noticed by the film industry and soon, movie casting offers came rolling in. She started acting in films at age 16. She made her film debut with a leading role in the film A Chit The Laypyay (Love is the wind) alongside Dwe and Eaindra Kyaw Zin. The film was a domestic hit, and led to increased recognition for her.

In 2002, she starred in the big-screen film Kyar Mee Swal Ko Ko Myauk Muu Lae Ma Ma, where she played the leading role with Wai Lu Kyaw and Nandar Hlaing, which premiered in Myanmar cinemas in 2002. She moved to England in 2003. Thereafter she completely disappeared from a film career from the time of her marriage and had children.
Smile returned in 2012 and started a music career following a 10-year absence from the public eye. And then she started endeavoring to be able to produce and distribute her first solo album. She launched her debut solo album "New Me" on 15 October 2013 which turned out to be a success creating her a place to stand in Myanmar music industry. In 2017, she starred in 4 films, including Gayat Tway Par Hal. She published a biography book about body shaming and fitness called "Sharing Is Caring" on 10 February 2019. From 2000 to present, she has acted in more than 125 video/films.

Business
She is one of the most successful businesswomen in Myanmar and her husband owns VMG Telecoms and Ytalk under the VMG Group of Companies.

Filmography

Film (Cinema)

(Over 25 films)
A Chit The Lay Pyay  (2002)
Kyar Mee Swal Ko Ko Myauk Muu Lae Ma Ma (2002)
Gayat Tway Par Hal (2017)

Film

(Over 100 films)

Discography

Solo albums
New Me (2013)

Books
Sharing Is Caring (2019)

Personal life
Smile married to Pyae Maung, a businessman and she has two daughters, Su Nadi Maung and Su Yati Maung. Her eldest daughter, Su Nadi Maung (Portia) is a model.

References

Living people
1986 births
Burmese film actresses
Burmese female models
21st-century Burmese actresses
21st-century Burmese women singers
Burmese writers
Burmese businesspeople
People from Yangon